The Fore River Club House is a historic club house at Follett and Beechwood Streets in Quincy, Massachusetts.  It is a long -story wood-frame structure, with rectilinear eyebrow dormers on the water-facing roof.   The Shingle-style clubhouse was built in 1917 by the Fore River Shipyard as a recreation center for its employees.  It originally housed a ballroom, bowling lanes, and billiard room.  It was acquired by the city in 1925, and is now a community center.

The building was listed on the National Register of Historic Places in 1989.

Gallery

See also
National Register of Historic Places listings in Quincy, Massachusetts

References

Buildings and structures in Quincy, Massachusetts
Clubhouses on the National Register of Historic Places in Massachusetts
Queen Anne architecture in Massachusetts
Buildings and structures completed in 1917
Shingle Style architecture in Massachusetts
National Register of Historic Places in Quincy, Massachusetts